

Films

References

 
2019 in LGBT history
2019
2019-related lists